Rafael Duran (born 17 March 1938) is a Venezuelan wrestler. He competed in the men's freestyle lightweight at the 1960 Summer Olympics.

References

External links
 

1938 births
Living people
Venezuelan male sport wrestlers
Olympic wrestlers of Venezuela
Wrestlers at the 1960 Summer Olympics
Sportspeople from Caracas